This is a list of ministers of the Supreme Federal Court (STF) of Brazil since its foundation as Supremo Tribunal de Justiça (Supreme Justice Court) the highest Brazilian court during the imperial period (1822–1889).

Supremo Tribunal de Justiça – Brazilian Empire

Supremo Tribunal Federal – Republic 
STF, in its initial composition had fifteen ministers. Decree n.º 19.656, Provisory Government act of 1931, reduced the number of ministers to eleven. The AI-2, of 1965, raised the number of ministers to 16. In 1969, AI-6 returned the composition to eleven ministers, which stays until this day.

Legend

 AI-6.  Seat closed by AI-6 in 1969.
 D-1931.  Seat closed by decree nº 19.711 in 1931.
 AI-2.  Seat created by AI-2 in 1965.

References

Supreme Federal Court of Brazil justices